The 1944 United States Senate election in Oklahoma took place on November 7, 1944. Incumbent Democratic Senator Elmer Thomas ran for re-election to a fourth term. Thomas once again faced a stiff challenge in the Democratic primary, this time from Congressman Wesley E. Disney and Lieutenant Governor James E. Berry. As was the case in 1938, Thomas won renomination only with a narrow plurality. In the general election, he faced former State Senator William J. Otjen, the 1942 Republican nominee for Governor. Though Thomas's performance was much reduced compared to six years prior, he still defeated Otjen by a wide margin.

Democratic primary

Candidates
 Elmer Thomas, incumbent U.S. Senator
 Wesley E. Disney, U.S. Congressman from Oklahoma's 1st congressional district
 James E. Berry, Lieutenant Governor of Oklahoma
 Elmer Fraker
 Fletcher S. Riley
 A. F. Shaw
 Dan Nelson
 Charles West
 Lily Allen Lasley
 Lattie Hughes

Results

Republican primary

Candidates
 William J. Otjen, former State Senator, 1942 Republican nominee for Governor
 Pat W. Murphy, Cushing clergyman
 Harry O. Glasser, former State Senator, 1938 Republican nominee for the U.S. Senate
 O. O. Owens
 Frank A. Anderson
 Fred E. Pickard
 John M. Claypool
 S. M. Stauffer
 Sim L. Liles

Results

General election

Results

References

Oklahoma
1944
1944 Oklahoma elections